The Roman Catholic Diocese of Jalandhar / Jullundur is a Latin Church diocese of the Catholic Church, located in the city of Jalandhar in the Ecclesiastical province of Delhi in India.

History
 17 January 1952: Established as the Apostolic Prefecture of Jalandhar from the Diocese of Lahore
 6 December 1971: Promoted as Diocese of Jalandhar

Leadership
 Bishops of Jalandhar (Latin Church)
 Bishop Franco Mulakkal (4 August 2013 – present)
 Bishop Anil Joseph Thomas Couto (16 April 2007 – 30 November 2012)
 Bishop Symphorian Thomas Keeprath, O.F.M. Cap. (18 March 1972 – 24 February 2007)
 Prefects Apostolic of Jalandhar (Latin Church) 
 Fr. Alban of Blackburn, O.F.M. Cap. (31 October 1952 – 1971)

Sexual assault case 

IN 2021, a court ruled Bishop Franco was not guilty. On 14 January 2022, the Additional Sessions Court acquitted him of all charges. In 2018 a rape complaint against Jalandhar Bishop Franco Mulakkal, the police received a copy of the victim nun's statement, given to Changanasseri, Kerala Judicial First Class Magistrate under Section 164 of Code of Criminal Procedure (CrPC, India). Kerala Police arrested  Franco Mulakkal for allegedly raping a nun multiple times between 2014 and 2016. The arrest was made in September 2018 in Kochi, India. He was interrogated by the Kerala Police for three days before arrest. Vijay Sakhare, inspector general of Kerala Police said "After our investigation, we have enough evidence that the bishop, prima facie, has committed the crime." On September 20, 2018, Pope Francis accepted Mulakki's request for a leave of absence.

On 8 October 2018, Bishop Agnelo Gracias took office as apostolic administrator sede plena et ad nutum Sanctae Sedis of the diocese, after Mulakkal's arrest.In 2022, the trial court found Bishop Franco not guilty and free from all the charges.

References

External links
 GCatholic.org
 Catholic Hierarchy
 Website of the diocese

Roman Catholic dioceses in India
Roman Catholic dioceses and prelatures established in the 20th century
Christianity in Punjab, India
Christian organizations established in 1952
1952 establishments in India
Jalandhar